The Aero A.11 was a biplane light bomber and reconnaissance aircraft built in Czechoslovakia between the First and Second World Wars. It formed the basis for many other Czechoslovakian military aircraft of the inter-war period. Around 250 were built, with some remaining in service at the outbreak of World War II.

Designed by Antonin Husnik, it was a development of the Aero A.12 (despite what the numbering of the designs might suggest). A Hispano-Suiza 8Fb-powered version, the A.11H-s was built for the Finnish Air Force, the only foreign operator of the type. The Finns had eight aircraft of this type and used them between 1927-39.

Variants
 A.11 : Two-seat light bomber, reconnaissance biplane.
 A.11HS : Export version for Finland.
 A.11N : Night bomber version.
 Ab.11 : Light bomber version.

Operators

Czechoslovak Air Force

Finnish Air Force

Specifications (Ab.11)

See also

References

External links

Photo 
drawings at Ugolok Neba site.

1920s Czechoslovakian bomber aircraft
1920s Czechoslovakian military reconnaissance aircraft
A011
Biplanes
Single-engined tractor aircraft
Aircraft first flown in 1925
World War II aircraft of Finland